Perserikatan Sepakbola Banjarmasin or Peseban is an Indonesian football team based in Banjarmasin, South Kalimantan. They currently compete in Liga 3.

References

External links

Football clubs in Indonesia
Football clubs in South Kalimantan
Sport in South Kalimantan
Association football clubs established in 1953
1953 establishments in Indonesia